The rijksweg N48 is a Dutch expressway, managed by Rijkswaterstaat between the A28 and A37 motorways near Hoogeveen and the N340 and N36 just north of Ommen, and is an important north-south route in the provinces of Overijssel and Drenthe. All junctions on the route are grade-separated crossings, except for the roundabout at its terminus in Ommen. The total length of the N48 is approximately 19 kilometers (12 miles).

Route description

History

Junction and exit list

References

Motorways in the Netherlands
Motorways in Drenthe
Motorways in Overijssel